Jeffrey Schnapp is an American university professor who works as a cultural historian, designer, and technologist. Until joining the Harvard University in 2011, he was the director of the Stanford Humanities Lab from its foundation in 1999 through 2009. At Harvard, he holds the Carl Pescosolido Chair in Romance and Comparative Literatures in the Faculty of Arts and Sciences and also teaches in the Department of Architecture at Harvard's Graduate School of Design. Effective June 2015, he assumed the position of Chief Executive Officer and co-founder of Piaggio Fast Forward, the robotics division of the Piaggio. In 2018 he transitioned to the role of Chief Visionary Officer, handing over the role of CEO to his co-founder Greg Lynn. In October 2021, Piaggio Fast Forward launched a second product, gita mini.

Biography

Until joining the Harvard University faculty in 2011, Jeffrey Schnapp was the director of the Stanford Humanities Lab from its foundation in 1999 through 2009. At Stanford University he occupied the Pierotti Chair in Italian Literature and was professor of French & Italian, and Comparative Literature, with an additional affiliation to German Studies. Though primarily based in the field of Italian studies, he has played a pioneering role in several areas of transdisciplinary research and led the development of a new wave of digital humanities work. His research interests extend from antiquity to the present, encompassing the material history of literature, the history of 20th-century architecture and design, and the cultural history of science and engineering. Trained as a Romance linguist, Schnapp is the author or editor of twenty five books and an extensive corpus of essays on authors such as Virgil, Ovid, Dante, Hildegard of Bingen, Petrarch, Machiavelli, Gabriele d'Annunzio, and Filippo Tommaso Marinetti, and on topics such as late antique patchwork poetry, futurist and dadaist visual poetics, the cultural history of coffee consumption, glass architecture, the iconography of the pipe in modern art, and the electronic book. His book Crowds was the recipient of the Modernist Studies Association prize for best book of 2006.

At Harvard, he is the Carl Pescosolido Professor of Romance and Comparative Literatures in the Faculty of Arts and Sciences, but also teaches in the Department of Architecture at the Graduate School of Design. In addition to serving as the founder/faculty director of metaLAB (at) Harvard--an "idea foundry, knowledge design laboratory, and production studio"--he serves as faculty co-director of the Berkman Klein Center for Internet and Society where metaLAB is housed. 

Schnapp was the co-editor of the Johns Hopkins University Press quarterly Modernism/modernity, the official journal of the Modernist Studies Association, up through the end of 2014. He is also a guest curator who has collaborated with several leading museums: among them, the Canadian Centre for Architecture, the Cantor Arts Center, the Wolfsonian-FIU, the Triennale di Milano, Fondazione Cirulli (Bologna), and the Centro Internazionale di Studi di Architettura Andrea Palladio (Vicenza). His Trento Tunnels project – a 6000 sq. meter pair of superhighway tunnels at the entrance to the Northern Italian city of Trent, repurposed as an experimental history museum, has undergone several editions since 2008: among them, "I Trentini e la Grande Guerra (Il popolo scomparso/la sua storia ritrovata)" (2008-2009), "Storicamente ABC" (2010-2011), and "Ski Past" (2012). "Panorama of the Cold War," carried out with Elisabetta Terragni (Studio Terragni Architetti) and Daniele Ledda (XY comm), was exhibited in the Albanian Pavilion of the 2012 Venice Biennale of Architecture and in Erasmus Effect – Architetti italiani all’estero / Italian Architects Abroad at the MAXXI (Dec. 2013-April 2014). He was also on the team that developed BZ ’18-’45, a documentation center built under Marcello Piacentini's Bolzano Victory Monument open to the public since July 2014.

metaLAB
In February 2011, Schnapp founded a new laboratory at Harvard under the aegis of the Berkman Center for Internet and Society: metaLAB (at) Harvard, with his initial collaborators James Burns, Daniele Ledda, Kara Oehler, Gerard R. Pietrushko, and Jesse Shapins. metaLAB is a kind of "do tank" that is broadly engaged with the modeling of new and experimental forms of networked culture and knowledge. 
At the end of 2021, metaLAB opened a new platform in Berlin, Germany, in collaboration with the Institut für Theaterwissenschaft at the Freie Universität Berlin: metaLAB (at) F.U. Berlin. A new integrated website for the conjoined Harvard and F.U. Berlin platforms was launched in January 2022.

The Library Beyond the Book
Schnapp's The Library Beyond the Book of 2013 (published in 2014), written with Matthew Battles, surveys elements of libraries potentially relevant to today's transitional digital era. It examines past mainstays such as buildings, shelves, catalogs, access cards, reference desks, carrel desks, and librarians, and wonders how each might find new purpose in the near future. It discusses the importance of databases, digital preservation, mobile libraries, serendipity, cloistering, and meatspaces, and mentions initiatives such as Rio de Janeiro's Manguinhos Library Park, the pop-up Occupy Wall Street Library,  Chattanooga Public Library's makerspace, the Digital Public Library of America, and London's Idea Store. In the words of one reviewer, the authors "imagine six plausible scenarios for serving tomorrow's diverse information consumers, situating libraries as everything from study shelters to civic institutions functioning as mobile libraries, reading rooms promoting social change, and/or event-driven knowledge centers." It is the first in a series of Metalab publications "that will investigate the role of print-based scholarship in the digital age."

Cold Storage

Among metaLAB's recent experiments is "Cold Storage": an experimental web documentary (or so-called database documentary) made up of over 500 media objects developed in 2013-2015 as an "animated archive" and extension of the volume "The Library Beyond the Book," published in 2014 in the metaLABprojects series by Harvard University Press. The work was directed by Cristoforo Magliozzi and produced by Schnapp.

futureSTAGE

Coordinated with Paolo Petrocelli, the director of the Stauffer Academy for Strings in Cremona, Italy, and involving some thirty leading professionals from every walk of the performing arts world, the futureSTAGE project was developed during the years of the Covid-19 pandemic in order to forster innovation in the form of a post-pandemic turn to a "new normal" and to prompt creative and critical reflection on the future of the performing arts, performing arts venues, organizational structures, and policies. It has initially assumed the form of the Future Stage Manifesto.

Principal books 

 The Transfiguration of History at the Center of Dante's Paradise. Princeton & Guildford: Princeton U P, 1986.
 L'Espositione di Bernardino Daniello da Lucca sopra la Commedia di Dante. Ed. with Robert Hollander; in collaboration with Kevin Brownlee and Nancy J. Vickers.  Hanover & London: U P of New England, 1989.
 The Poetry of Allusion: Virgil and Ovid in Dante's Commedia. Ed. with Rachel Jacoff. Stanford: Stanford U P, 1991.
 Staging Fascism: 18 BL and The Theater of Masses for Masses. Stanford: Stanford UP, 1996. Expanded edition (in Italian translation), 18 BL. Mussolini e l'opera d'arte di massa. Milan: Garzanti Editore, 1996.
 A Primer of Italian Fascism. Edition with commentary and introduction. Trans. by Jeffrey T. Schnapp, Olivia E. Sears, and Maria Stampino. European Horizons series. Lincoln: University of Nebraska Press, 2000.
 Gaetano Ciocca. Costruttore, inventore, scrittore. Introduction by Giorgio Ciucci. With brief contributions by Massimo Martignoni and Paola Pettenella. Quaderni di Architettura 3. Museo di Arte Moderna, Trento-Rovereto. Milan: Skira, 2000.
 Vedette fiumane. L'occupazione vista e vissuta da Madeleine Witherspoon Dent Gori-Montanelli, crocerossina americana, e da Francesco Gori-Montanelli, Capo del Genio e del reparto fotografico.  Ed. with introduction, notes, and iconographic apparatus.  Trans. Valentina Ricci.  Venice: Marsilio Editore, 2000.
 Hugo Ball/Jonathan Hammer, Ball and Hammer (Tenderenda the Fantast).  Edited and introduced by Jeffrey T. Schnapp.  New Haven: Yale U P, 2002.
 Anno X. La Mostra della Rivoluzione fascista del 1932: genesi - sviluppo - contesto culturale-storico - ricezione.  With an afterword by Claudio Fogu. Piste - Piccola biblioteca di storia 4. Rome-Pisa: Istituti Editoriali e Poligrafici Internazionali, 2003.
 Building Fascism, Communism, Democracy: Gaetano Ciocca—Builder, Inventor, Farmer, Writer, Engineer. Stanford: Stanford U P, 2003.
 In cima—Giuseppe Terragni per Margherita Sarfatti (Nuove architetture della memoria), catalogue for exhibition of same name, curated and edited by Jeffrey T. Schnapp, Centro Internazionale Andrea Palladio, Vicenza, June 26, 2004 – January 1, 2005. Venice: Marsilio Editore, June 2004.
 Filippo Tommaso Marinetti, Teatro, edited by Jeffrey T. Schnapp, 2 vols., Oscar Mondadori, (Milan: Mondadori 2004).
 Revolutionary Tides, catalogue for exhibition of same name, curated and edited by Jeffrey T. Schnapp, Cantor Arts Center / The Wolfsonian-FIU, Hoover Institution, (Milan: Skira and Cantor Arts Center, 2005). Italian, French, and English editions. 
 Crowds, ed. by Jeffrey T. Schnapp and Matthew Tiews, (Stanford: Stanford University Press, 2006).
 Neoantiqua - Nove ensaios sobre literatura, linguagem e pensamento na Idade Média e no Renascimiento. Introduction by Luiz Costa-Lima. Trans. Erick Felinto de Oliveira, Alessandra Vannucci, and Maria Lucia Daflon. (Collection of essays, some previously published, translated into Portuguese). Rio de Janeiro: Eduerj (Editora da Universidade do Estado de Rio de Janeiro), 2008.
 Italiamerica I, ed. and introduced by Emanuela Scarpellini and Jeffrey T. Schnapp, vol. 1, Fondazione Mondadori, Milan: Il Saggiatore, 2008.
 SPEED limits, ed. by Jeffrey T. Schnapp, Wolfsonian-FIU and the Canadian Centre for Architecture, Milan: Skira, 2009.
 The Electric Information Age Book: McLuhan / Agel / Fiore and the Experimental Paperback, with Adam Michaels, introduction by Steven Heller, afterword by Andrew Blauvelt, New York: Princeton Architectural Press, 2012.
 Italiamerica II, ed. and introduced by Emanuela Scarpellini and Jeffrey T. Schnapp, vol. 2, Fondazione Mondadori, Milan: Il Saggiatore, 2012.
 Modernitalia, ed. by Francesca Santovetti, Italian Modernities 13, New York: Peter Lang, 2012.
 Digital_Humanities, with Anne Burdick, Johanna Drucker, Peter Lunenfeld, and Todd Presner, Cambridge: MIT Press, 2012. Open edition available at https://web.archive.org/web/20131023012128/http://mitpress.mit.edu/sites/default/files/titles/content/9780262018470_Open_Access_Edition.pdf.
 
 Knowledge Design, Herrenhausen Lectures pamphlet series, Volkswagen Foundation, Hannover, Germany, (2014).
 Blueprint for Counter Education – Expanded Reprint, a new edition of Maurice Stein and Larry Miller's 1970 work, edited by Jeffrey Schnapp and designed by Adam Michaels – Project Projects, (New York: Inventory Books, 2016).
 FuturPiaggio. Six Italian Lessons on Mobility and Modern Life, English edition, (Milan/New York: Rizzoli, 2017).
 Moto Guzzi 100 Years, English edition, (Milan/New York, Rizzoli International, 2021).

References

External links
 Personal website
 A dossier of materials on the Trento Tunnels project including a film, photographs, and  other documents
 A lengthy 2009 interview with Pierpaolo Antonello from the University of Cambridge, England, regarding his work was published in "Italian Studies" 64.1 (spring 2009), pp. 144–162.
 An open edition of the co-authored "Digital Humanities" is available.

American medievalists
Cultural historians
Stanford University faculty
Harvard University faculty
American designers
1954 births
Living people
American non-fiction writers
American curators
American literary critics
Vassar College alumni